Julie Khaner (born December 5, 1957) is a Canadian television and film actress, best known for her roles in as Alana Newman Robinovitch in Street Legal, Emily Henchpaw in the 1995 version of Jake and the Kid, Sidney Dernhoff in The Newsroom, Gen in Deepwater Black and Bridey James in Videodrome. She also appeared in the 1995 Susan Dey vampire flick Deadly Love.

Career 
Khaner is a two-time Gemini Award nominee, receiving nominations for Best Supporting Actress in a Drama Series in 1994 for Street Legal and Best Actress in a Dramatic Program or Miniseries in 1999 for the television film Justice.

In 2000, she appeared in All-American Girl: The Mary Kay Letourneau Story.

Filmography

Film

Television

References

External links

1957 births
Actresses from Montreal
Anglophone Quebec people
Canadian film actresses
Canadian television actresses
Living people